Ukraine competed at the 2019 European Games, in Minsk, Belarus from 21 to 30 June 2019 and won 52 medals, including 16 golds. Ukrainian athletes competed in all 15 sports included in the programm. Ukraine's team was third biggest team at the Games. Ukraine has previously competed at the 2015 European Games in Baku, Azerbaijan, where it won 46 medals, including eight golds.

Medalists

Competitors 
Ukraine was represented by 199 athletes in 15 sports.

Tables legend

Archery

These Games saw a worse performance of Ukrainian archers in comparison to the 2015 European Games when Ukraine had won three medals. Moreover, Ukraine did not manage to qualify a men's team and no one reached quarterfinals in individual competitions. As in 2015, Ukrainian women's team lost to Belarus (but in 2015 they met in semifinals). For Veronika Marchenko, Anastasia Pavlova and Lidiia Sichenikova, those were second European Games in their career. No Ukrainian athletes secured a spot in compound competitions which were held at the European Games for the first time.

Recurve

Athletics

Ukraine did not compete in athletics at the previous games since it was combined then with the European Team Championships Third League competition and Ukraine was at that time in the Super League division. Ukrainian athletes won the overall Dynamic New Athletics competition, which was held for the first time, as well as several individual medals. Kristina Gryshutina (long jump) had been included by the NOC of Ukraine to the list of participants, though she did not compete at the Games.

Track events

Field events

Team event

Badminton

These Games saw a worse performance of Ukrainian badmintonists in comparison to the 2015 European Games since no one managed to qualify for the knock-out stage (Marija Ulitina in women's singles and Gennadiy Natarov/Yuliya Kazarinova in mixed doubles competed in the knock-out stage in 2015). Apart from Marija Ulitina, the following athletes competed for the second time in the European Games: Artem Pochtarov competed in 2015 in men's doubles, Yelyzaveta Zharka in women's doubles.

Basketball 3x3

For the men's team, those Games were first since Ukraine had not qualified for Baku 2015. Women's team participated for the second time after having won silver in 2015.

Men
Yevhen Balaban
Andrii Kozhemiakin
Dmytro Lypovtsev
Oleksii Shchepkin

Women
Veronika Kosmach
Ganna Rulyova
Yevheniia Spitkovska
Tetyana Yurkevichus

Beach soccer

This was second consecutive appearance for Ukrainian team. They qualified through the 2018 Euro Beach Soccer League by placing 7th in the final leg.

Men
Andrii Borsuk
Ihor Borsuk
Ivan Hlutskyi
Oleksandr Korniichuk
Kostiantyn Makeiev
Dmytro Medvid
Andrii Nerush
Roman Pachev
Vitalii Sydorenko
Dmytro Voitenko
Yaroslav Zavorotnyi
Oleh Zborovskyi

Boxing

Ukraine, as all other nations, was entitled to enter a male in each category. In women's boxing, Ukraine did not manage to qualify in two categories out of five (57 kg and 69 kg).

Men

Women

Canoe sprint

The only event Ukrainian athletes did not participate in was Men's K-4 500 metres.

Men

Women

Cycling 

Ukraine participated in all cycling events.

Road
Men

Women

Track
Sprint

Team sprint

Team pursuit

Keirin

Madison

Time trial

Individual pursuit

Scratch

Points race

Omnium

Gymnastics 

Ukraine was represented in all events but for aerobics.

Acrobatic 
Women's groups

Mixed pairs

Artistic
Men
Qualification

All-around

Apparatus finals

Women
Qualification

All-around

Apparatus finals

Rhythmic 
All-around final and apparatus qualification

Apparatus finals

Group finals

Group all-around

Trampoline

Judo

Ukraine was not represented in the men's 81 kg, women's 52 kg and women's 70 kg. Vasylyna Kyrychenko (women's +78 kg) had been included by the NOC of Ukraine to the list of participants, though she did not compete at the Games.

Men

Women

Mixed team

Ukraine vs. Slovenia
 Andrii Koleśnyk 0-1 Vito Dragic
 Mariia Skora 1-0 Kaja Kajzer
 Dmytro Kanivets 0-1 Martin Hojak
 Yuliia Hrebenozhko 0-1 Anka Pogačnik
 Quedjau Nhabali 1-0 David Kukovica
 Halyna Tarasova w/o
 Mariia Skora 0-1 Kaja Kajzer

Karate

Ukrainian athletes managed to qualify for 6 out of 12 events in karate and they won medals in all but for one event they took part in. Ukraine was represented only in kumite competitions. 

Men

Women

Sambo

Ukrainian athletes competed in 15 out of 18 events (except for men's 68 kg, men's 74 kg and men's 82 kg).

Men

Women

Shooting

Ukraine athletes managed to qualify for almost all events with the exception of men's trap and, respectively, mixed team trap. Ukraine was represented only in skeet competitions by just one athlete.

Table tennis

Ukraine did not qualify for men's team and mixed doubles..

Individual

Team

 First round

 Quarterfinal

Wrestling

Ukraine was represented in almost all events except men's freestyle 86 kg.

Men's freestyle

Greco-Roman

Women's freestyle

References

Nations at the 2019 European Games
European Games
2019